= Shan Sum Columbarium =

Columbarium in Hong Kong

Shan Sum Columbarium is a 12-story private columbarium located in Hong Kong. The building was designed by German architect Ulrich Kirchhoff, founder of the architecture office ICE - ideas for contemporary environments. It is a facility that functions as the final resting place.

The columbarium was opened in response to the dire shortage of urn spaces in Hong Kong. The city's ageing population and high death rates had pushed the government's urn capacity to its limits, leading to a severe shortage of places to lay its residents to rest. The columbarium was designed to accommodate 23,000 funeral urns, offering a range of options for families to choose from.

The basic two-person option starts at $58,000, while the top-tier package can cost up to $3 million. The cost makes it unaffordable for most people.

== Design and Features ==
The columbarium's design is inspired by traditional Chinese graveyards. Kirchhoff incorporated multiple features like hewn rock texture to evoke a sense of a close-knit neighborhood and the rooms are designed to provide intimacy.

The Shan Sum Columbarium offers a range of features and amenities to ensure a serene environment for the departed. The air-conditioned chambers store ashes in ornate compartments.

The columbarium also have pocket gardens, dehumidifiers and air-conditioning systems. Families can use an app through which they can pre-book a time slot to visit.
